Morinia skufyini is a species of cluster fly in the family Polleniidae.

Distribution
Russia.

References

Polleniidae
Insects described in 1983
Diptera of Asia